Skitching (abbreviated from "skate-hitching", pron: /ˈskɪtʃɪŋ/) is the act of hitching a ride by holding onto a motor vehicle while riding on a skateboard, roller skates, bicycle, or sneakers when there is snowfall. It is also sometimes  referred to as bumper hitching, bumpershining, poggying, or bizzing, skidhopping, bumper jumping, hooky bobbing or bunking, the latter five referring primarily to the equivalent done on icy or snowy streets without a skateboard or roller skates.  In addition, skitching can be performed on a bicycle or inner tube.

Types

The term "skitching" can refer to a number of related activities. The unifying concept is that the skitcher holds onto a motorized vehicle while it is in motion, using the vehicle to propel themselves along.

Skateboard skitching
By far the most referenced type of skitching in news sources and popular culture, if not necessarily the most practiced in reality, skateboard skitching is the act of holding onto a moving motor vehicle while riding a skateboard. Skateboard skitching has appeared in films and video games, and is confirmed to be the cause of death for a number of youths and young adults. Some young drivers are willing participants in skateboard skitching, which can open them up to legal action in the event of an accident.

Inline skates skitching
Skitching is also performed on inline skates. It has appeared in video games, for example Skitchin' and Jet Set Radio.

Bicycle skitching
Likely more common in practice than other varieties of skitching, bicycle skitching is the act of holding onto a motor vehicle while riding a bicycle. Bicycle skitching is frequently practiced by bicycle messengers in urban areas, with drivers who are most often unknowing of their activity.

Snow skitching
What may be the original type of skitching, snow skitching involves holding onto the bumper of a moving vehicle in a crouched position on snow-covered roads. The practice may have started after school when students were dropped off from their school bus, and used the bus to skitch closer to home so they wouldn't have to walk. The chromed metal bumpers of the late Fifties provided a good grip to gloved fingers.
Car speeds were quite slow due to very icy conditions. It was not something to be encouraged but was widely practiced.

Motorcycle skitching
In motorcycle skitching, the driver of the motorcycle flips their legs over the saddle and drags their feet on the ground while holding onto the handlebars. This is similar to ghost-riding in motor vehicles. Motorcycle skitching requires metal plates on the soles of the rider's shoes to protect them from the road surface.

Dangers
Because skitching is often done in traffic, on inadequate equipment for the speeds travelled, and sometimes without the knowledge of the driver of the vehicle, there is significant potential for injury or death. The skateboarding advocacy group Skaters for Public Skateparks reported that 2 of 42 skateboarding deaths in 2011 in the United States were skitching-related.

Skateboarding celebrity Tony Hawk has advocated against the practice of skitching due to the related deaths and injuries.

Cultural references

In film and television
Michael J. Fox can be seen skitching in the 1985 film Back to the Future, as can Michael Beck in the 1980 film Xanadu and Christian Slater in the 1989  film Gleaming the Cube and also in the 2016 film Nerve as a dangerous stunt. It was portrayed in Biker Boyz (2003), Lords of Dogtown (2005), and Premium Rush (2012) as well.

In literature
 In Neal Stephenson's 1992 novel Snow Crash skateboard Kouriers use a magnetic harpoon to skitch.

In video games
 The Sega Mega Drive/Genesis 1994 video game Skitchin' involves racing against other skitchers.
 The 2002 video game Tony Hawk's Pro Skater 4 and subsequent games also feature skitching.
 Skitching is featured in the game Jet Grind Radio.
 Bully also features skitching after receiving the skateboard.
 Skitching is also possible in Skate 3.
 Skitching is also included in Aggressive Inline.

See also 

 Car surfing
 Inner tube
 List of train surfing injuries and deaths
 Train surfing

References

Skateboarding
Hazardous motor vehicle activities